Iridopteryginae is a subfamily of mantises in the family Gonypetidae. There are two tribes, distributed in tropical Asia.

Genera
The Mantodea Species File lists:
tribe Amantini
 Amantis Giglio-Tos, 1915
tribe Iridopterygini
 subtribe Iridopterygina
 Hapalopeza Stal, 1877
 Hapalopezella Giglio-Tos, 1915 (monotypic)
 Iridopteryx Saussure, 1869 (monotypic: Iridopteryx iridipennis Saussure, 1869)
 Micromantis Saussure, 1870 (monotypic)
 Muscimantis Henry, 1931 (monotypic)
 Pezomantis Uvarov, 1927 (monotypic)
 Spilomantis Giglio-Tos, 1915
 subtribe Tricondylomimina
 Tricondylomimus Chopard, 1930

References

Further reading

External links 
 

Gonypetidae
Mantodea subfamilies
Iridopteryginae